Terrence Alcock (born 9 December 1946) is an English former footballer. A defender, he played 330 league games in a 15-year career in the English Football League.

He played for Port Vale from 1963 to 1967, before spending nine years with Blackpool following a £30,000 transfer. He helped the "Seasiders" to win promotion out of the Second Division in 1969–70, and also featured in the club's Anglo-Italian Cup success in 1971. He made 112 league appearances for Port Vale and 191 league appearances for Blackpool. After 1976 he had short spells back at Port Vale, and then Halifax Town and Lancaster City. He also had short loan spells with Bury, Blackburn Rovers and American side Portland Timbers.

Career

Port Vale
Alcock was born in Hanley, and attended Wellington Road School, where he played as a goalkeeper, before later converting into a versatile central defender. Starting his career at Third Division club Port Vale in 1963, he played two games in 1963–64, before he turned professional in September 1964 under Freddie Steele. He then featured 31 times in the 1964–65 season, as the "Valiants" were relegated into the Fourth Division. He made 46 appearances in 1965–66, as new boss Jackie Mudie struggled to keep Vale off the foot of the table; they eventually finished 19th, four points ahead of bottom club Wrexham. He played 45 games in 1966–67, picking up attention from higher profile clubs.

Blackpool
Alcock left Vale Park in August 1967, when he was signed by Blackpool manager Stan Mortensen, whose side were then playing in the Second Division, for a fee of £30,000, which was a Port Vale club record at the time. His new team missed out on promotion to the First Division in 1967–68 after they finished one point behind champions Ipswich Town and level on points with Queens Park Rangers, who had a superior goal average. They dropped to eighth in 1968–69, before winning promotion as runners-up in 1969–70 under the stewardship of Les Shannon. However, new boss Bob Stokoe could not prevent the club dropping straight back out of the top-flight with a bottom-placed finish in 1970–71. Alcock was though a member of the Blackpool team that won the 1971 Anglo-Italian Cup, beating Bologna 2–1 after extra time in the final at the Stadio Renato Dall'Ara on 12 June 1971. In the 1971–72 season he spent a short time on loan at Fourth Division club Bury, playing six league games and scoring one goal. Alcock played in the 1972 Anglo-Italian Cup, scoring in Blackpool's 10–0 victory over Lanerossi Vicenza on 10 June 1971 at Bloomfield Road, en route to Blackpool's appearance in the final. Alcock scored the "Seasiders"' goal as they lost out 3–1 to Roma at the Stadio Olimpico. Blackpool finished seventh in the second tier in 1972–73, before posting a fifth-place finish in 1973–74 under Harry Potts; they ended the campaign just two places and two points behind promoted Carlisle United. They then finished seventh in 1974–75 and tenth in 1975–76. In December 1976, he joined league rivals Blackburn Rovers on loan, playing three league and two FA Cup games. He played a total of 191 league games for the "Seasiders", scoring 21 goals.

Later career
He re-joined Port Vale in February 1977, who were now managed by former teammate Roy Sproson. However he just played the one game in 1976–77. He then spent a short period on loan with North American Soccer League club Portland Timbers, scoring two goals in seven appearances in 1977. He returned to Burslem to replace an absent David Harris, and scored twice in three League Cup appearances in 1977–78. He joined Fourth Division club Halifax Town in 1978, and then later that same year moved into non-League football with Lancaster City, of the Northern Premier League, with whom he finished his playing career.

Post-retirement
After retiring from football, Alcock became the licensee of the Blackpool Supporters Club at Bloomfield Road, before taking on similar positions at pubs in Burscough, Warton and then Wrea Green.

Career statistics
Source:

Honours
Blackpool
Football League Second Division second-place promotion: 1969–70
Anglo-Italian Cup: 1971; runner-up: 1972

References

1946 births
Living people
Sportspeople from Hanley, Staffordshire
English footballers
Association football defenders
Port Vale F.C. players
Blackpool F.C. players
Bury F.C. players
Blackburn Rovers F.C. players
Portland Timbers (1975–1982) players
Halifax Town A.F.C. players
Lancaster City F.C. players
English Football League players
North American Soccer League (1968–1984) players
Northern Premier League players
English expatriate sportspeople in the United States
Expatriate soccer players in the United States
English expatriate footballers